Honey Hill may refer to:

 Honey Hill, Cambridge, a small elevation in Cambridge, England
 Honey Hill, Kent, hamlet in Kent, England
 Honey Hill, Oklahoma, census-designated place in the United States
 Honey Hill (Otsego County, New York), an elevation in the United States
 Battle of Honey Hill, American Civil War battle
 Honey Hill-Boyd's Neck Battlefield, American Civil War battlefield in South Carolina